Mahadrodroka is a town and commune in Madagascar. It belongs to the district of Analalava, which is a part of Sofia Region. The population of the commune was estimated to be approximately 7,000 in 2001 commune census.

Mahadrodroka has a riverine harbour. Only primary schooling is available. The majority 65% of the population of the commune are farmers. The most important crop is rice, while other important products are bananas and cassava. Services provide employment for 5% of the population. Additionally fishing employs 30% of the population.

References and notes 

Populated places in Sofia Region